This list is of the Cultural Properties of Japan designated in the category of  for the Prefecture of Tokushima.

National Cultural Properties
As of 1 January 2015, seventeen Important Cultural Properties with thirty-seven component structures have been designated, being of national significance.

Prefectural Cultural Properties
As of 19 December 2014, sixteen properties have been designated at a prefectural level.

Municipal Cultural Properties
As of 1 May 2014, forty-two properties have been designated at a municipal level.

Registered Cultural Properties
As of 1 January 2015, one hundred and thirteen properties at forty-one sites have been registered (as opposed to designated) at a national level.

See also
 Cultural Properties of Japan
 National Treasures of Japan
 List of Historic Sites of Japan (Tokushima)

References

External links
  List of Cultural Properties in Tokushima Prefecture

Cultural Properties,Tokushima
Buildings and structures in Tokushima Prefecture
Tokushima
Structures,Tokushima